The 1979 Chico State Wildcats football team represented California State University, Chico as a member of the Far Western Conference (FWC) during the 1979 NCAA Division II football season. Led by sixth-year head coach Dick Trimmer, Chico State compiled an overall record of 5–6 with a mark of 2–3 in conference play, placing fourth in the FWC. The team was outscored by its opponents 234 to 150 for the season. The Wildcats played home games at University Stadium in Chico, California.

Schedule

References

Chico State
Chico State Wildcats football seasons
Chico State Wildcats football